Kalji (also Romanized as Kaljī; also known as Kalīj, Khalii, and Khalji) is a village in Shalyar Rural District, Uraman District, Sarvabad County, Kurdistan Province, Iran. At the 2006 census, its population was 332, in 80 families. The village is populated by Kurds.

References 

Towns and villages in Sarvabad County
Kurdish settlements in Kurdistan Province